The 1948 United States Senate election in Iowa took place on November 2, 1948. Incumbent Republican Senator George A. Wilson ran for re-election to a second term but was defeated by Democratic former Senator Guy Gillette.

Republican primary

Candidates
 John N. Calhoun, former State Senator from Keosauqua (1933–35) and National Guard Lieutenant Colonel in World War II
George A. Wilson, incumbent Senator since 1943

Results

Democratic primary

Candidates
Guy Gillette, former U.S. Senator (1936–45)
Ernest J. Seemann, perennial candidate

Results

General election

Results

See also 
 1948 United States Senate elections

References 

1948
Iowa
United States Senate